Draženko Mitrović (born 9 August 1979 in Banja Luka, Bosnia and Herzegovina, Yugoslavia) is a Paralympian athlete from Serbia competing mainly in category F53/54 discus events.

Biography
He was wounded by gunfire in 1989 and then became a paraplegic. Draženko competed in the 2008 Summer Paralympics where he finished second in the F53/54 discus and also competed in the javelin.

External links
 

Paralympic athletes of Serbia
Athletes (track and field) at the 2008 Summer Paralympics
Athletes (track and field) at the 2012 Summer Paralympics
Paralympic silver medalists for Serbia
Living people
1979 births
Sportspeople from Banja Luka
Serbs of Bosnia and Herzegovina
World record holders in Paralympic athletics
Medalists at the 2008 Summer Paralympics
Medalists at the 2012 Summer Paralympics
Paralympic medalists in athletics (track and field)
Serbian male discus throwers
Serbian male javelin throwers
Serbian male shot putters
Wheelchair discus throwers
Wheelchair javelin throwers
Wheelchair shot putters
Paralympic discus throwers
Paralympic javelin throwers
Paralympic shot putters